The 2017 Kent State Golden Flashes football team represented Kent State University in the 2017 NCAA Division I FBS football season. They were led by fifth-year head coach Paul Haynes and played their home games at Dix Stadium in Kent, Ohio as members of the East Division of the Mid-American Conference. They finished the season 2–10, 1–7 in MAC play to finish in last place in the East Division.

On August 28, 2017, the school announced that head coach Paul Haynes would be taking a medical leave of absence and miss the first two to three weeks of the season. Offensive coordinator Don Treadwell was named interim head coach. Haynes returned to the Flashes after missing two games due to prostate cancer treatments.

On November 22, one day after the Flashes' final game of the season against Akron, the school fired Paul Haynes after five losing seasons. On December 19, the school hired Sean Lewis as head coach.

Previous season 
The Golden Flashes finished the 2016 season  3–9, 2–6 in MAC play to finish in fifth place in the East Division.

Coaching staff

Source:

Schedule

Source:

Game summaries

at Clemson

Howard

at Marshall

at Louisville

Buffalo

at Northern Illinois

Miami (OH)

at Ohio

Bowling Green

at Western Michigan

Central Michigan

at Akron

References

Kent State
Kent State Golden Flashes football seasons
Kent State Golden Flashes football